A list of films produced in Egypt in 1967. For an A-Z list of films currently on Wikipedia, see :Category:Egyptian films.

1967

External links
 Egyptian films of 1967 at the Internet Movie Database
 Egyptian films of 1967 at elCinema.com

Lists of Egyptian films by year
1967 in Egypt
Lists of 1967 films by country or language